Craig Lewis (born January 10, 1985) is an American former professional road bicycle racer, who competed professionally between 2007 and 2013.

In 2004, while riding for  – then a small team on the US circuit that would later grow to be one of the world's biggest, currently known as  – Lewis was gravely injured when he was struck by a car during an individual time trial at the Tour de Georgia. He lost consciousness, punctured both lungs, suffered severe internal bleeding, and fractured dozens of bones. After months of rehab and physical therapy, and multiple surgeries, Lewis eventually made a full recovery.

After failing to earn a contract for the 2014 season, Lewis retired in February 2014.

Palmares

2006
 1st  Under-23 National Road Race Championships
 1st  Under-23 National Criterium Championships
2007
 3rd Overall Tour of Bahamas
 6th Overall Tour of Ireland
 7th Overall Tour de l'Avenir
2009
 1st Stage 3 TTT Tour de Romandie
 7th Overall Tour of Ireland
2011
 1st Stage 1 TTT Giro d'Italia
2012
 1st Stage 2 Tour de Beauce

References

External links
2009 VELOBIOS Rider Profile
Palmarès by cyclingbase.com 

American male cyclists
Sportspeople from Spartanburg, South Carolina
1985 births
Living people